Pelham is an unincorporated community and census-designated place (CDP) in Grundy County, Tennessee, United States. As of the 2010 census, its population was 403. Pelham has a post office with ZIP code 37366, which opened on April 4, 1832.

The community is believed to have been named for a family of early settlers. There is a school in Pelham. It is Pelham Elementary school.

Demographics

References

Census-designated places in Grundy County, Tennessee
Unincorporated communities in Tennessee
Census-designated places in Tennessee
Unincorporated communities in Grundy County, Tennessee